Blutaparon vermiculare, with common names silverhead, silverweed, saltweed, and samphire, is a species of plant in the family Amaranthaceae, native to Central America and the southeastern United States. It is an edible

References

Amaranthaceae